Cypriot–British relations are foreign relations between Cyprus and the United Kingdom. Cyprus gained its independence from the United Kingdom in 1960, after 82 years of British control. The two countries now enjoy warm relations, however the continuing British sovereignty of the Akrotiri and Dhekelia Sovereign Base Areas has continued to divide Cypriots. The two countries share membership of the United Nations and the Commonwealth of Nations.

The United Kingdom has a High Commission in Nicosia. The current British High Commissioner to Cyprus is Ben Rawlings. Cyprus has a High Commission in London, the current Cypriot High Commissioner to the UK is Andreas Kakouris.

History 

Under Prime Minister Benjamin Disraeli and Foreign Minister Lord Salisbury, Britain used its diplomatic prowess to obtain Cyprus from the Ottoman Empire in 1878. Britain promised to use Cyprus as a base to protect the Ottoman Empire from Russia, according to the secret Cyprus Convention agreement. Instead of using the Army, the British set up a semi-military group called the Cyprus Military Police. Disraeli, leader of the Conservative party, was promoting British imperialism and expanding the British Empire. William Ewart Gladstone, leader of the opposition Liberal party, vehemently opposed the takeover as immoral, but he did not return the island. 
The island served Britain as a key military base protecting  the Suez Canal and especially the sea route to  British India, which was then Britain's most important overseas possession. In 1906, a new harbour at Famagusta was completed, increasing the importance of Cyprus as a strategic naval outpost protecting the approaches to the Suez Canal. In 1914 in the First World War the Ottoman Empire and Britain went to war. On 5 November 1914 Britain annexed Cyprus, bringing an end to the convention.

Cyprus gained its independence from the United Kingdom in 1960, after 82 years of British control. The UK was also a signatory to a treaty with Greece and Turkey concerning the independence of Cyprus, the Treaty of Guarantee, which maintains that Britain is a "guarantor power" of the island's independence.

For four years after Cypriot independence, the UK Government supported the Republic of Cyprus financially, under the 1960 Exchange of Notes on Financial Assistance to the Republic of Cyprus. Among other items, that Exchange of Notes provided for payment of a total of £12,000,000 "by way of grant" (and not related to the bases), starting with £4,000,000 in 1961 and tapering down to £1,500,000 in March 1965, with provision for the UK Government to review the situation for each subsequent five-year period, in consultation with the Republic government, and "determine the amount of financial aid to be provided". After the intercommunal conflict of 1963–64 it stopped, claiming there was no guarantee that both communities would benefit equally from that money. The Cypriot government is still claiming money  for the years from 1964 to now although to date has taken no international legal action to test the validity of its claim. Estimates for the claimed debt range from several hundred thousand to over €1,000,000,000..

Modern relations

The two countries share membership of the Commonwealth of Nations. At the moment, according to a 2011 estimate by Yiannis Papadakis, there are an estimated 270,000 Greek Cypriots living in the UK. Furthermore, a 2011 report by the Home Affairs Committee states that there are 300,000 Turkish Cypriots living in the UK. There are at least 50,000 British who reside in Cyprus, with most having their property in Paphos district. Current relations between Cyprus and the United Kingdom are considered excellent with high levels of cooperation on energy, diplomacy and education. On 16 January 2014 President of Cyprus Nicos Anastasiades and British Prime Minister David Cameron reaffirmed the strong bonds of friendship and partnership between Cyprus and the UK, during a meeting at 10 Downing Street.

Akrotiri and Dhekelia

The continuing British sovereignty of the Akrotiri and Dhekelia Sovereign Base Areas has continued to divide Cypriots. Several Cypriot villages remain enclaved in the areas, and there have been numerous arrests of anti-British demonstrators over the past few years. These activists assert that the UK should not continue to hold territory in an EU state.

In January 2014, an agreement signed by Cypriot Foreign Minister Ioannis Kasoulides and Foreign Secretary William Hague, in the presence of President Nicos Anastasiades, was made to lift the restrictions in developing properties within the British bases areas. The right of the owners to develop their land concerns 15 local administrative units, which make up 78% of the total area of the bases. The agreement lifted all restrictions about eligibility and the development of properties within the British Bases so that all regulations applied in the Republic of Cyprus will be valid within the Bases areas, as regards purchasing and developing properties by European or third country nationals.

Brits in Cyprus

The British are the main immigrant Western European group in Cyprus, which is also home to the largest British community in the Middle East by far.

Diplomacy

Republic of Cyprus
London (High Commission) 

of the United Kingdom
Nicosia (High Commission)

See also 
 Foreign relations of Cyprus
 Foreign relations of the United Kingdom
 National Federation of Cypriots in the United Kingdom
EU–UK relations

References

Further reading
 Georghallides, George S. A political and administrative history of Cyprus, 1918-1926: with a survey of the foundations of British rule (Cyprus Research Centre, 1979).
 Hakki, Murat Metin. The Cyprus issue: a documentary history, 1878-2007 (Bloomsbury Publishing, 2007).
 Mallinson, William. Cyprus: A modern history (IB Tauris, 2005).
 Medlicott, W. N. “The Gladstone Government and the Cyprus Convention, 1880-85.” Journal of Modern History 13#2 (1940), pp. 186–208. online.
 Persianis, Panayiotis. "The British Colonial Education 'Lending' Policy in Cyprus (1878-1960): An intriguing example of an elusive 'adapted education' policy." Comparative Education 32.1 (1996): 45–68.
 Phylaktis, Kate. "Banking in a British colony: Cyprus 1878–1959." Business History 30.4 (1988): 416-431 online .
 Rosenbaum, Naomi. "Success in foreign policy: The British in Cyprus, 1878-1960." Canadian Journal of Political Science (1970): 605-627 online.
 Varnava, Andrekos. British imperialism in Cyprus, 1878–1915: the inconsequential possession (Manchester UP, 2017)

External links 
  British Foreign Ministry about relations with Cyprus
  British embassy in Nicosia
  List of Treaties between the 2 countries by the Ministry of Foreign Affairs of Cyprus

 
British diaspora in the Middle East
British diaspora in Europe
Cypriot people of British descent
Bilateral relations of the United Kingdom
United Kingdom
Cyprus and the Commonwealth of Nations
United Kingdom and the Commonwealth of Nations
Relations of colonizer and former colony